EN 13445 - Unfired Pressure Vessels is a standard that provides rules for the design, fabrication, and inspection of pressure vessels

EN 13445 consists of 8 parts:
 EN 13445-1 : Unfired pressure vessels - Part 1: General
 EN 13445-2 : Unfired pressure vessels - Part 2: Materials
 EN 13445-3 : Unfired pressure vessels - Part 3: Design
 EN 13445-4 : Unfired pressure vessels - Part 4: Fabrication
 EN 13445-5 : Unfired pressure vessels - Part 5: Inspection and testing
 EN 13445-6 : Unfired pressure vessels - Part 6: Requirements for the design and fabrication of pressure vessels and pressure parts constructed from spheroidal graphite cast iron
 EN 13445-8 : Unfired pressure vessels - Part 8: Additional requirements for pressure vessels of aluminium and aluminium alloys
 EN 13445-10:2015 : Unfired pressure vessels - Part 10: Additional requirements for pressure vessels of nickel and nickel alloys. PUBLISHED 2016.6.30

Parts 7 and 9 do exist but they are merely technical reports.

EN 13445 was introduced in 2002 as a replacement for national pressure vessel design and construction codes and standards in the European Union and is harmonized  with the Pressure Equipment Directive (2014/68/EU or "PED"). New updated versions of all parts were published between 2009 and 2012.

See also 
 Pressure Equipment Directive

References

External links
 EN 13445 Maintenance Agency (French/English)  Union de Normalisation de la Mécanique UNM

Pressure vessels
13445
Structural engineering standards